Mikaela Mullaney Straus (born December 19, 1998), known by her stage name King Princess, is an American singer, songwriter, and musician from Brooklyn, New York. She is signed to Mark Ronson's label Zelig Records, an imprint of Columbia Records. In February 2018, King Princess released her debut single "1950", from the Make My Bed EP. The song was a commercial success, charting in multiple territories, and was later certified platinum by the Recording Industry Association of America. Her second single, "Talia", was certified gold in Australia by the Australian Recording Industry Association. King Princess released her debut studio album Cheap Queen in 2019 to widespread critical acclaim.

Early life 
Straus was born and raised in the New York City borough of Brooklyn; she is the child of recording engineer Oliver H. Straus Jr. and Agnes "Aggie" Mullaney. Her parents divorced when she was young. On her mother's side, she is of Irish, Italian, and Polish descent. On her father's side, her great-great-grandparents include Isidor Straus, a U.S. Congressman and co-owner of Macy's, and Ida Straus; she was descended from German Jewish families, who emigrated to the United States from the Kingdom of Bavaria and Rhineland-Palatinate. The couple died in the sinking of the passenger ship RMS Titanic. However, Straus stated in a Rolling Stone interview that she is not an heiress and did not inherit any fortune. She has also clarified this information on her social media platforms.

Straus spent much of her childhood following her father to work at his recording studio, Mission Sound. There, she learned several instruments, including bass, guitar, piano, and drums, as well as music-production techniques and insight into the music industry. Straus' inspiration in those years had come from the rock music of the bands Led Zeppelin and T. Rex, as well as Jack White. In 2012, she received a scholarship to attend Avenues: The World School, a private school in Manhattan, after submitting a CD of songs she had written.

After high school, Straus moved to Los Angeles to study at the USC Thornton School of Music. However, after a year, she dropped out in favor of her music career.

Career 

A music label offered to sign Straus at the age of 11, but she refused to do so because of her experience watching other artists work with a music label in her father's studio. The labels would control the artists' products and change the feel of the music. She did not want to sign with a record label until she had a definition of her music, how she wanted to run the production, and with whom she would work.

In February 2018, King Princess released their debut single, "1950". The song is a tribute to the 1952 novel The Price of Salt by Patricia Highsmith, to the LGBT community and to queer love. The song reached a wide audience when British singer Harry Styles tweeted a lyric from the song. Straus followed this with their second single, "Talia", in April. She released her debut extended play, Make My Bed, on June 15, 2018. Later that year, she earned Breakout Pop Artist of the Year honors from Vivid Seats.

In 2019, it was announced that King Princess would perform at Lollapalooza and Coachella. She played The Park stage at the 2019 Glastonbury Festival and was joined by Mark Ronson (dressed as King Princess) for a performance of her collaboration "Pieces of Us" from his 2019 album Late Night Feelings. Zelig Recordings released King Princess' debut album Cheap Queen on October 25, 2019. She produced much of the album itself, including programming many of the instruments. In November 2019, King Princess was revealed to be the opening act for the European leg of Harry Styles' planned 2020 concert tour, Love On Tour. King Princess performed as the musical guest on Saturday Night Live (Season 45, Episode 7) on November 23, 2019. It released a deluxe edition of Cheap Queen on February 14, 2020. The release included five previously unreleased new songs, including "Ohio".

In October 2020, King Princess released a new single, "Only Time Makes It Human", followed by "PAIN" in November. In a November 2020 interview with Zane Lowe, she confirmed that she was working on their second album with Mark Ronson.

In 2022, King Princess joined Kacey Musgraves on her Star-Crossed: Unveiled tour as an opening act. She also opened for Shawn Mendes' Wonder: the World Tour and will open for the Red Hot Chili Peppers. King Princess was also a judge on the Netflix game show Is It Cake?

From July through October 2022, King Princess embarked on her Hold On Baby North American tour with openers Dora Jar and St. Panther. She also featured guests, such as Julian Casablancas at Radio City Music Hall, where they covered "You Only Live Once."

Personal life 
Straus is gay and genderqueer. From early 2018 to late 2018, she dated actress Amandla Stenberg. Since early 2019, Straus has been in a relationship with Quinn Whitney Wilson, the creative director of musician Lizzo. Regarding her gender identity, she has said in an interview with W magazine, "I like being a woman sometimes. I would say 49 percent of the time I love my titties. But I'm not fully a woman. I'm somebody who falls center on the gender spectrum, and it changes day to day. It's just not in me to decide." Regarding their pronouns, King Princess stated to Rolling Stone in 2022 that she "never felt offended [by] the pronoun situation... He. She. It. They. Xenu."

Discography

Studio albums

Extended plays

Singles

As lead artist

As featured artist

Promotional singles

Music videos

Guest appearances

Awards and nominations 
In June 2020, in honor of the 50th anniversary of the first LGBTQ pride parade, Queerty named her among the fifty heroes "leading the nation toward equality, acceptance, and dignity for all people".

References

External links 

 

1998 births
Living people
21st-century American women singers
American women pop singers
American women singer-songwriters
American multi-instrumentalists
American people of Irish descent
American people of Italian descent
American people of Polish descent
American people of German-Jewish descent
American lesbian musicians
American LGBT singers
American LGBT songwriters
LGBT people from New York (state)
Lesbian singers
Lesbian songwriters
Musicians from Brooklyn
Straus family
People with non-binary gender identities
Non-binary singers
Non-binary songwriters
Feminist musicians
20th-century American LGBT people
21st-century LGBT people
Singer-songwriters from New York (state)
American indie pop musicians